Mary Vandervliet (3 July 1912 – 6 February 2004) was a Canadian sprinter. She competed in the women's 100 metres at the 1932 Summer Olympics.

References

External links
 

1912 births
2004 deaths
Athletes (track and field) at the 1932 Summer Olympics
Canadian female sprinters
Olympic track and field athletes of Canada
Athletes from Montreal
Olympic female sprinters